Margaret Eileen Twomey  (born 21 February 1963) is Ambassador of Australia to Italy (since July 2020). She is former High Commissioner of Australia to Fiji, from November 2014 to November 2017. Twomey has an honours degree in Arts (Russian and French) from the University of Melbourne. Her grandfather Patrick Joseph Twomey started the PJ Twomey Hospital for Lepers in Fiji.

Former appointments
 High Commissioner to Fiji (2014–2017)
Head of Policy Planning, DFAT (2013–2014)
 Ambassador to Russia and Kazakhstan, Kyrgyzstan, Turkmenistan, Uzbekistan, Tajikistan, Armenia, Moldova, Belarus (2008–2012), and Ukraine (2008–2009).
 Australia’s Ambassador to East Timor (2004–08)
 Deputy High Commissioner in Suva (2000–02)
 First Secretary and Counsellor in London (1995–2000)
 Third, later Second Secretary in Belgrade (1990–92)

References

1963 births
Living people
Ambassadors of Australia to Russia
Ambassadors of Australia to Kazakhstan
Ambassadors of Australia to Ukraine
Ambassadors of Australia to Kyrgyzstan
Ambassadors of Australia to Turkmenistan
Ambassadors of Australia to Uzbekistan
Ambassadors of Australia to Moldova
Ambassadors of Australia to Tajikistan
Ambassadors of Australia to Belarus
Ambassadors of Australia to Armenia
Ambassadors of Australia to East Timor
University of Melbourne alumni
High Commissioners of Australia to Fiji
Ambassadors of Australia to Albania
Ambassadors of Australia to Italy
Ambassadors of Australia to San Marino
Ambassadors of Australia to Libya
Australian women ambassadors